Heinrich Alfred Barb (1 January 1826 – 2 June 1883) was a Galician academic, university director, civil servant, interpreter and author who received recognition both from his native Austro - Hungary and overseas for his contribution to the Arts and Sciences, and in particular towards the study of Persian and oriental languages. He was the director of what is now the Diplomatic Academy of Vienna (at that time still the Oriental Academy). Born Jewish, he formally left the Jewish faith on 1 February 1884 while in his first year of law at the University of Vienna and rose in the civil service to the rank of Hofrat, a distinction rarely accorded to those of Jewish ancestry.

Family and Education 
The son of Josef Barb, the town medical officer, and Rosalia Hiller, Barb was born in Mostyska, one of three brothers. His cousin was Isaac Barb, notable for his role in the revival of the Hebrew language during the mid-19th century. Barb's renunciation of the Jewish faith caused an irrevocable break with his family. He never married.

Honours and awards 
 Knight of the Order of the Iron Crown III Class
 Golden Civil Service Cross with Crown
 Austrian Golden Medal for the Arts and Sciences
 The Most Noble Order of the Crown of Thailand
 Order of Glory (Ottoman Empire)
 Order of the Lion and the Sun
 Order of the Medjidie III Class

References 

Anna Staudacher, Jüdische Konvertiten in Wien 1782-1868. Peter Lang: Frankfurt a. M. 2002 
"Death Notice" Wiener Sonn- und Montags-Zeitung, 3 June 1883 page 3
H. Slaby, Bindenschild und Sonnenlöwe: Die Geschichte der österreichisch-iranischen Beziehungen bis zur Gegenwart, Graz, 1982.
Polak Jacob Eduard at Iranica.com accessed 2 February 2016
"75 Jahre Orientalisches Institut der Universität Wien" Österreichische Hochschulzeitung, 15 October 1961

External links 

1826 births
1883 deaths
Austrian Jews
Austrian politicians
People from Mostyska